Occidozyga semipalmata is a species of frog in the family Dicroglossidae. It is endemic to western and northern Sulawesi, Indonesia. It has been found in Gunung Lombobatang Natural Reserve, Lore Lindu National Park, and Bogani Nani Wartabone National Park.

Description
Tadpoles are not known. Occidozyga tompotika was formerly confused with it, before being described in 2011.

Habitat and ecology
Its natural habitats are stony, highland streams in closed-canopy forest. It is threatened by habitat loss.

References

semipalmata
Endemic fauna of Indonesia
Amphibians of Sulawesi
Amphibians described in 1927
Taxa named by Malcolm Arthur Smith
Taxonomy articles created by Polbot